The climate in Spain varies across continental Spain. Spain is the most climatically diverse country in Europe with 13 different Köppen climates, excluding the Canary Islands, and is within the 10 most climatically diverse countries in the world. The country is dominated by five major climate regions, with the other regions including smaller portions of the country. The Mediterranean environment and location in Europe mean that it will experience greater heatwaves and dry weather due to climate change.

Zones 
Five main climatic zones can be distinguished, according to the country's Köppen-Geiger climate classification and orographic conditions:
The hot-summer Mediterranean climate (Csa) which is also characterized by dry and warm/hot summers and cool to mild and wet winters. According to the Köppen climate classification, this climate is dominant on the Iberian Peninsula, particularly the variety with summer droughts, covering all but the far northern part of the country where the Oceanic climate predominates. The hot-summer Mediterranean climate is further divided into the "Standard Mediterranean" of lowland regions and Continental Mediterranean Climate of the interior, according to altitude and the mildness or harshness of the winter season. The Standard Mediterranean covers coastal areas (excluding the northern Atlantic coast) the Guadalquivir river basin and the lower reaches of the Tagus and Guadiana basins to the west of the country. The Continental Mediterranean Climate predominates in Spain's vast table lands, Meseta Central, of the interior. 
The warm-summer Mediterranean climate (Csb) which predominates in parts of northwestern Spain and mostly inland in central-northern Spain at altitudes above 900-1000 masl.
The oceanic climate (Cfb) is located in the northern part of the country, especially in the regions of Galicia, Basque Country, Asturias, Cantabria, and Navarre. This region has regular snowfall in the winter months.
The semiarid climate (BSh and BSk) is predominant in the south eastern part of the country (Almeria province in Eastern Andalusia, Murcia region and Alicante province in Southern Valencia) and in the middle reaches of the Ebro valley to the north east (Zaragoza province), reaching as far west as southern Navarre. It is also present in large areas of the central table lands (primarily in Madrid and in the La Mancha region which includes parts of Cuenca, Guadalajara, and Toledo provinces) and some of the driest areas of Extremadura. In contrast to the Mediterranean climate, the dry season continues beyond the end of summer and the vegetation is less dense.
The warm-summer continental climate (Dfb) which can be found in many areas in north-eastern Spain, in areas starting with altitudes above 1000-1100 masl. It can be found also in some areas in the Cantabrian Mountains and the highest areas of the Sistema Ibérico mountain range in central-eastern Spain.
Apart from the five main climate zones, other noticeable sub-zones can be found, such as the humid subtropical climate in large areas in the northern half of Catalonia going down to Barcelona, the province of Huesca and northern Navarre. The dry continental climates all across Spain in the highest areas (notably in the Sierra Nevada and the highest areas in central-northern Spain), the alpine climate and the Subarctic climate in the higher areas of northern Spain's various mountain ranges (notably the Cantabrian Mountains and the Pyrenees), a tropical climate in the coastal areas of the Canary Islands and a hot desert climate in the Southeastern coastline and eastern parts of the Canary Islands, notably around Almeria and Las Palmas.

Hot Summer Typical Mediterranean climate 
The Csa hot-summer Mediterranean climate is found on most of the Mediterranean coast of Spain starting from the border with Portugal to the border with France, with a few exceptions. It also extends inland in Andalusia and Extremadura. It is characterized by hot dry summers and mild winters with infrequent frosts in inland locations with this climate. The summers are hot, the winters are mild and most of precipitation falls in the autumn. Examples of cities with Csa climate are Málaga, Valencia, Palma or Seville.

Warm Summer Mediterranean climate 
The Csb warm-summer Mediterranean climate is found in parts of Galicia and the western areas of Castilla y Leon. Coastal Mediterranean region is marked by Leveche winds: hot, dry, easterly or southeasterly air currents that originate over North Africa. Periods of these winds, which sometimes carry fine Saharan dust, are more common in spring and are associated with a sudden, usually short-lived, increase in temperature. A cooler easterly wind, the Levante, funnels between the Sistema Penibetico and the Atlas Mountains of North Africa. These easterly winds are the ones which most influence the Mediterranean climate. The most populous city with Csb climate in Spain is Vigo. Other cities with this climate are Ávila, León and Salamanca.

Inland Hot and Warm Summer Mediterranean climates 
The inland areas of the Iberian Peninsula, on the Central Plateau, have a Csa or Csb Mediterranean climates with greater seasonal differences than the coast. The summers are usually hotter than in the coast, regularly exceeding . By contrast, there are low temperatures in winter, from cool to cold winters, with temperatures below  not being uncommon. The cold increases the higher the altitude is. These are often accompanied by moderate snowfall. Although it rarely rains during summer, there is often heavy rainfall in spring and autumn. Cities with this climate are Madrid, Ciudad Real, Logroño, and Ávila.

Oceanic climate 
An oceanic climate prevails from the Pyrenees to Galicia, area which is sometimes called "Green Spain", characterized by relatively mild winters and warm summers. The climate and landscape are determined by the Atlantic Ocean winds whose moisture gets trapped by the mountains circumventing the Spanish Atlantic coast. Because of the Foehn effect, the southern slopes fall inside the rain shadow zone and so Green Spain contrasts starkly with the rest of Spain. The rainfall is generally abundant, exceeding  and is fairly evenly spread out over the year, with the driest month above , which is the minimum criteria for an oceanic climate according to Köppen. Although Köppen officially limits the oceanic domain to the Asturias and the Basque Country region, certain authors such as Trewartha prefer to extend this climatic zone to the north-west part of the peninsula to Galicia, due to the moderate summer temperatures.

The moderating effects of the sea are less prominent further inland, where temperatures are more extreme than those on the coast. Distance from the Atlantic Ocean also has an effect on precipitation levels, so there is less rainfall in the east than in the west. Autumn (October to December) is the wettest season, while July is the driest month. The high humidity and the prevailing off-shore winds make fog and mist common along the north west coast; this phenomenon is less frequent a short distance inland because the mountains form a barrier to the maritime moisture.

Galician variant 

The Galician climate (Csb) is similar to that of the coastal areas of Oregon, Washington and Vancouver but with much warmer winters. This is a characteristic which distinguishes Galicia from a typical Cfb climate. This climate, which is sometimes classified as "Mediterranean", is classified as "Oceanic" according to other authors such as Trewartha, due to the lower summer temperatures and higher rainfall. Nonetheless, the area displays typical Mediterranean features, including regular forest fires, which are often started deliberately by arsonists. Most of Galicia has high annual sunshine hours, although there are notable regional variations, ranging from 1600 hours in the north east to 2600 in the south east and the Rías Baixas. Not all Galicia has a Csb climate, most of the north and central mountains have a typical oceanic Cfb. Some valleys in the south are classified as Hot-summer Mediterranean (Csa), like the comarca of O Condado, the city of Ourense or O Ribeiro.

In North-West Castile, the climate is classified also as Csb because the temperatures of summer are cooler due to the altitude.

Humid subtropical climate 

The humid subtropical climate exists in large areas of north-eastern Spain, mostly in the northern half of Catalonia and the province of Huesca. This climate is also found across northern Navarra and the northern areas of the province of Guadalajara. The largest city with this climate in Spain is Barcelona.

Hot and Cold Semiarid climates 

The semiarid climate (BSk and BSh in the Köppen climate classification) is predominant in south-eastern Spain (covering most of Alicante, Murcia and Almería provinces), and in certain parts of the Ebro Valley. It is also present in parts of the centre, south and west of the country which borders between a Mediterranean and semi-arid climate. It is very hot during the summer (temperatures can exceed ) and the drought usually extends into the autumn (rainfall about 300 mm – ).

Desert climate 
The desert climate exists in a few zones of the south-eastern coast of Spain and in eastern parts of the Canary Islands. Within mainland Spain, it appears predominantly in Almería, with the city of Almería falling under the hot desert climate categorization (Köppen: BWh) as the average temperature is 19.1 °C and the average precipitation is approximately 200mm. The desert climate exists in other areas of the southeast, such as the Tabernas Desert, which has an annual average temperature of 17.9 °C placing it just 0.1 °C below under the categorization of hot desert climate (Köppen: BWh), so it has a cold desert climate (Köppen: BWk). It also exists in areas of Murcia and specific points inland of the province of Alicante.

Other types 
Besides the above three major climate zones, there are four other climate types in Spain:

 The mountainous climate is present in the Picos de Europa, Sistema Central, Sistema Ibérico, Pyrenees and Sierra Nevada, qualified as an Alpine climate, Spain's major mountain systems.
The low-lying areas of the Canary Islands have a tropical climate in terms of temperature, this being mild and stable throughout the year. Most of the islands have hot desert climates or hot semi-arid climates, and a low altitude areas have tropical semi-arid climates, like the cities of Santa Cruz de Tenerife, Las Palmas de Gran Canaria or La Palma which surpass  in the coldest month, meeting the requirements for tropical climates under the Köppen climate classification. In terms of precipitation, the eastern islands are semiarid while the westernmost ones receive more rainfall, with some very wet areas in the mountains of La Gomera, La Palma and Tenerife, home to the cloud forest known as laurisilva. The easternmost islands are arid with Saharan climate moderated by the Atlantic Ocean.

The southernmost coast of Spain (Málaga and Granada's coastal strip) has the warmest winters across Europe, with very sunny and mostly warm days with total absence of winter frosts allowing for the prolific cultivation of tropical fruits such as mango, papaya, cherimoya, pitaya and the carambola, amongst others. The benign winter, with minimum night temperatures in January rarely falling below 5 °C (46 °F) is due to the microclimate created by the Sierra Nevada mountains to the north of this coastal strip, preventing cooler north winds from reaching the area.

Parts of the south East coast also have a Hot Arid climate, with annual average temperatures above 18 °C and annual rainfall below 200mm. Almeria province is the only area in Europe within this climatic zone.

Climate change

Temperature averages for Spanish mainland cities

Atlantic (Northern) Spain

Continental Spain

Mediterranean Spain

Temperature averages for Spanish non-mainland cities

Extreme temperature records in selected cities 

Sea temperature

See also
 Climate of Barcelona
 Climate of Valencia
 Climate of Madrid
 Climate of Bilbao
 Climate of Gibraltar
 Wave height
 Western Mediterranean oscillation

Notes

References

 
Spain